Aapta Mitrulu is a 1963 Indian Telugu-language drama film, produced and directed by Kadaru Nagabhushanam under the Sri Raja Rajeswari Film Company banner. It stars N. T. Rama Rao, Krishna Kumari and Kanta Rao, with music composed by Ghantasala.

Plot 
Prakash (N. T. Rama Rao) & Shekar (Kanta Rao) are childhood friends. Shekar belongs to a rich family whereas Prakash works as his employee. Prakash's sister Vimala (Krishna Kumari) is in love with Shekar but Shekar's mother Kamalamma (Kannamba), wants to make a rich alliance with her son. Once Shekar sends Prakash to Bangalore on an official trip where he gets acquainted with a beautiful girl Kokila (Rajasulochana), the daughter of a millionaire, Kameswara Rao (Relangi), and both fall in love. Unknowingly, Kamalamma makes Shekar's marriage proposal to Kokila when she learns about the love affair of Kokila & Prakash. Angered, Kamalamma develops a grudge in Shekar's mind against Prakash. Meanwhile, in a business deal, Shekar quarrels with a broker and unfortunately, the broker dies. Here Prakash indicts himself on assurance Shekar to marry Vimala. After that, Prakash is sentenced to 6 years and Shekar marries Vimala secretly, but his crooked Shekar deceives her after getting pregnant. Distressed, Vimala tries to commit suicide, but she is rescued by an old man, Ramayya (Perumallu), and gives birth to a baby boy. Time passes, and Prakash releases when Shekar misinforms him regarding the elopement of Vimala and desperate, Prakash leaves the city. Ahead, Vimala activates herself as a music teacher, once a millionaire Dhanakoti (Mikkilineni), tries to molest her when Prakash saves her. At that time, he discovers the reality of Shekar. Parallelly, Shekar finds out Vimala & the child are alive, so, he ploys to kidnap them when Prakash comes to their rescue. Furious Prakash seeks to slay Shekar and Vimala obstructs his way when Shekar realizes his mistake. At last, Kamalamma also says remorses Prakash and Vimala. Finally, the movie ends with the marriage of Prakash & Kokila and Shekar surrendering himself to the Police.

Cast 
N. T. Rama Rao as Prakash
Krishna Kumari as Vimala
Kanta Rao as Shekhar
Relangi as Kameswara Rao
Mikkilineni as Dhanakoti
Perumallu as Ramaiah
A. V. Subba Rao
Girija as Kanakam
Rajasulochana as Kokila
Kannamba as Kamalamma
Rushyendramani as Shantamma

Soundtrack 

Music composed by Ghantasala. Lyrics were written by Samudrala Jr.

References

External links 
 

Indian drama films
Films scored by Ghantasala (musician)